Sogelau Tuvalu (born 5 June 1994) is an American Samoan track and field athlete who represented American Samoa at the 2011 World Championships in Athletics in the 100 meters, despite being trained as a shot putter.

2011 World Athletics Championships
Having not qualified to compete at the shot put event, Tuvalu was entered into the 100 meters at the 2011 World Athletics Championships in Daegu, which had no qualification standard for smaller nations. Running in the fourth heat of the preliminary round, Tuvalu finished 5 seconds slower than first-placed Malaysian Mohammed Noor Imran Hadi, finishing in 15.66s. Tuvalu is also one of the youngest debutants in the history of the World Athletics Championships, making his first and only appearance aged 17.

References

External links 

 Profile at World Athletics.org

American Samoan male sprinters
1995 births
Living people
World Athletics Championships athletes for American Samoa